A Trick of the Sea is the second album by Piano Magic. It is the thirteenth entry in Darla Records' Bliss Out series.

Track listing 

 "A Trick of the Sea" – 20:22
 "Halloween Boat" – 18:58

References 

1998 albums
Piano Magic albums